The Whitchurch and Tattenhall Railway was a line in Cheshire built by the London and North Western Railway in the 19th century. Although only a branch line, the route was built to main line standards with double track along its entire length. It was used on occasion to stable the British Royal Train in sidings on the eve of official visits by members of the Royal Family.

History
The line, which was built by the LNWR, opened in 1872. It connected the Cheshire villages of Malpas, Hampton, Edge, Duckington, Broxton, and Tattenhall with Chester and Whitchurch. Goods traffic was always the priority for the line; although a limited number of local passenger services did run until they were withdrawn in 1957. 

South Wales coal was the main source of freight traffic when the line opened. Much of it was steam coal that was being sent to the docks at Birkenhead. This was in direct competition to the Great Western Railway which was carrying coal from the North Wales Coalfield via the Wrexham and Minera Railway or Shrewsbury–Chester line. Mineral traffic went into decline after the First World War when coastal shipping from Barry or Cardiff had become the preferred method of transporting coal from South Wales to Merseyside. 

The railway was often used as an overnight stop by the Royal Train during official visits by the British Royal family to North West England or The Midlands. Archives at the National Railway Museum show that during the First World War the Royal train carrying George V and Queen Mary stayed at the station in May 1917. During their stay, they were guarded by troops from the Household Division. Likewise during the Second World, George VI stopped the night at Malpas in July 1942 before touring munitions factories in the Midlands. He returned again in 1949 before a visit to Chester. His daughter, Princess Elizabeth stayed June 1951. Her sister, Princess Margaret, was there in May 1954. The last time the Royal Train stayed the night in Malpas' sidings was October 1955. It was on the eve of an official visit to The Potteries by Elizabeth II, and her husband Prince Philip.

By the 1950s, the line was used by oil wagons going from Stanlow Oil Refinery to the West Midlands; the route avoided the busier and steeper gradients of Gresford Bank near Wrexham. In January 1964, the line was officially closed as part of the Beeching axe. Track was lifted in sections between 1964-65.

Despite the railway's complete closure, a section of double track at the northern end was reused as refuge sidings. The line's former signal box at Tattenhall Junction controlled access to the sidings from the North Wales Coast Line. The box and sidings were used until the late 1970s before the old junction and signal box were removed in the 1980s. In July 1971 a 10-car special school excursion train from Rhyl to Smethwick derailed as it passed through the former Tattenhall Junction (at the point where the former Whitchurch and Tattenhall Railway branched off). The track shifted under the train due to thermal stress causing the last three carriages to derail killing two children and injuring 26 people.

Preservation

Much of the former line and it infrastructure remains intact between Chester and Whitchurch. Although several bridges have been demolished, cutting have been ploughed in, and some sections have been redeveloped such as at Broxton.

References

Closed railway lines in North West England
Closed railway lines in the West Midlands (region)
Rail transport in Shropshire
Rail transport in Cheshire
London and North Western Railway
1963 disestablishments in England